The 1914 Reno earthquakes were a series of earthquakes in February and April 1914 in Reno, Nevada and the surrounding area. The 6.0 magnitude foreshock occurred on February 18, 1914, at 10:17am local time. The 6.4 magnitude main quake occurred at 12:34am local time.

See also 
List of earthquakes in 1914
List of earthquakes in Nevada
List of earthquakes in the United States
2008 Reno earthquakes

References 

1914 earthquakes
1914 in Nevada
1914 natural disasters in the United States
February 1914 events
Earthquakes in Nevada
Earthquakes in California
Natural disasters in Nevada
History of Reno, Nevada